This is a list in alphabetical order of cricketers who have played for Kalutara Town Club in first-class matches. Where there is an article, the link comes before the club career span, and the scorecard name (typically initials and surname) comes after. If no article is present, the scorecard name comes before the span.

C
 Y. Chamod (2015–16)
 R. Chandana (1996–97)
 V. Chandrasiri (2015–16)
 Hashan Chamara (2019–20) : K. H. C. Silva
 Sanka Chathuranga (2019–20) : S. Chathuranga
 P. Cooray (2019–20)

S
 Sumudu Sameera (2018–19)

References

Kalutara Town Club